Amador County Unified School District is a public school district based in Amador County, California, United States. It includes Ione Elementary, Jackson Elementary, Pine Grove Elementary, Pioneer Elementary, Sutter Creek Elementary, Sutter Creek Primary, Plymouth Elementary, Ione Elementary, Jackson Junior High, Ione Junior High, Amador High School, Argonaut High School, Shenandoah Valley Charter School, and North Star Independence Community School.

References

External links
 

School districts in California